The Falconer V-12 is an American V-12 performance racing engine engineered and built by American Ryan Falconer Racing Engines. The engine was first brought to market in 1990, and has roots in small block Chevrolet engines, and is available in multiple configurations for a variety of applications primarily designed for high performance purposes for automotive, custom, racing, marine and aviation use.

The engine is built to order and has a range of available configurations in both engine volume and accessories.

Applications
 Papa 51 Thunder Mustang

Specifications (Falconer V-12)

References

Thunder Mustang Specs

External links
Falconer Engines

V12 aircraft engines
Marine engines
1990s aircraft piston engines